Emarginella is a genus of small keyhole limpets, marine gastropod molluscs in the family Fissurellidae.

This genus has become a synonym of Emarginula Lamarck, 1801.

Species
 Emarginella eximia (Adams, 1852)
 Emarginella imella (Dall, 1926)
 Emarginella incisura (Adams, 1852)
 Emarginella okinawaensis Habe, 1953
 Emarginella planulata (Adams, 1852)
 Emarginella sakuraii Habe, 1963
 Emarginella sibogae (Schepman, 1908)
 Species brought into synonymy
 Emarginella biangulata (Sowerby, 1901): synonym of Hemimarginula biangulata (Sowerby III, 1901)
 Emarginella cumingii Sowerby, 1863: synonym of Hemitoma cumingii Sowerby, 1863
 Emarginella eximia (Adams, 1852): synonym of Emarginula eximia Adams, 1852
 Emarginella huzardii (Payraudeau, 1826): synonym of Emarginula huzardii (Payraudeau, 1826)
 Emarginella incisula (Adams, 1852): synonym of Emarginula incisula Adams, 1852
 Emarginella planulata (Adams, 1852): synonym of Emarginula planulata Adams, 1852

References

 Rolán E., 2005. Malacological Fauna From The Cape Verde Archipelago. Part 1, Polyplacophora and Gastropoda.

Fissurellidae